The 2013 CCHA Men's Ice Hockey Tournament was the 42nd Central Collegiate Hockey Association men's ice hockey tournament, and also the last for the original version of the conference. The tournament was played between March 8 and March 24, 2012 at campus locations and at Joe Louis Arena in Detroit, Michigan. The tournament was won by the Notre Dame Fighting Irishwinning the Mason Cup and earning the CCHA's automatic bid into the 2013 NCAA Division I Men's Ice Hockey Tournament.

The CCHA was revived in the 2021–22 season with eight members, and the tournament resumed at the end of that season.

Format
The tournament featured four rounds of play. In the first round the sixth and eleventh, seventh and tenth, and eighth and ninth seeds as determined by the final regular season standings played a best-of-three series, with the winners advancing to the quarterfinals. There, the first seed and lowest-ranked first-round winner, the second seed and second-lowest-ranked first-round winner, the third seed and second-highest-ranked first-round winner, and the fourth seed and the fifth seed played a best-of-three series, with the winners advancing to the semifinals. In the semifinals, the highest and lowest seeds and second-highest and second-lowest seeds played a single game, with the winner advancing to the championship game.

Regular season standings
Note: GP = Games played; W = Wins; L = Losses; T = Ties; PTS = Points; GF = Goals For; GA = Goals Against

Bracket

Tournament awards

All-Tournament Team
F T. J. Tynan* (Notre Dame)
F Andrew Copp (Michigan)
F Austin Wuthrich (Notre Dame)
D Jacob Trouba (Michigan)
D Stephen Johns (Notre Dame)
G Steven Racine (Michigan)
* Most Valuable Player(s)

References

External links
2013 CCHA Men's Ice Hockey Tournament

CCHA Men's Ice Hockey Tournament
CCHA Men's Ice Hockey Tournament